Wild Horse Mesa may refer to:

 Wild Horse Mesa (1925 film), directed by George B. Seitz
 Wild Horse Mesa (1932 film), directed by Henry Hathaway
 Wild Horse Mesa (1947 film), directed by Wallace Grissell